The emergence of metallurgy in pre-Columbian Mesoamerica occurred relatively late in the region's history, with distinctive works of metal apparent in West Mexico by roughly 800 CE, and perhaps as early as 600 CE.  Metallurgical techniques likely diffused northward from regions in Central or South America via maritime trade routes; recipients of these metallurgical technologies apparently exploited a wide range of material, including alloys of copper-silver, copper-arsenic, copper-tin and copper-arsenic-tin. 

Metal items crafted throughout Mesoamerica may be broken into three classes: utilitarian objects, objects used for individual ornamentation, and ceremonial/ritual objects. The latter two categories comprise the bulk of distinctly Mesoamerican artifacts, with metals playing a particularly important role in the sacred and symbolic cultural realms.

Possible location of Mesoamerican metallurgy

West Mexico
The earliest and most diverse finds of metal artifacts are from West Mexico stretching in a belt along the Pacific coast from Guerrero to Nayarit. This indicates that this region was a regional nucleus of metallurgy, from which elements of technique, form and style could have diffused throughout Mesoamerica.

Southern Mexico 
The Mixtec civilization have long been thought to be the dominant goldsmiths of post-classic Mesoamerica. A large number of gold artifacts found in central and southern Mexico have been attributed to the Mixtec.

Central Mexico 
There is recent evidence that suggests that the Aztec civilization was a distinct locus of metallurgy, though gold objects from this area had previously been attributed to the Mixtec.

Huastec area
Some locally produced artifacts have been found in  late-postclassic sites in the La Huasteca region.

Developments in West Mexican metallurgy

Phase 1: AD 600–1200/1300 
West Mexican smiths worked primarily in copper during the initial period, with some low-arsenic alloys, as well as occasional employment of silver and gold. Lost-wax cast bells were introduced from lower Central America and Colombia during this phase, along with several classes of cold-worked ornaments and hand tools, such as needles and tweezers.  The prototypes for these small, often utilitarian items appear rooted in southern Ecuador and northern Peru. Small copper rings, generally found in burial contexts, are also common to Ecuador and Western Mexico and are abundant during this phase. 

Excavated assemblages from the initial phase indicate that lost-wax cast bells also occupied a substantial portion of West Mexican artisans' efforts. Unlike similar bells recovered from coastal Ecuador, West Mexican bells were cast, rather than worked, metal. Typically composed of a smooth, suspended metal shell encasing an interior clapper, the West Mexican bells were generally fashioned from copper alloys and bore particular resemblance to bells made in Colombia, Panama and Costa Rica.

Phase 2: 1200/1300–1521 

Metal smiths demonstrated increasing technical sophistication, producing both utilitarian and status-linked items. During the latter phase, Michoacán emerged as a technological hub, with metal artifacts also appearing at the adjacent zones of Guerrero and Jalisco. 

Alloys became more prevalent during the second phase, as metal workers experimented with color, strength and fluidity. Formerly utilitarian assemblages transformed, with new focus placed upon metallic status objects. Further, the appearance of a copper-tin bronze alloy suggests contact between West Mexico and Peru during this period. However, many of the alloys/alloy concentrations used in West Mexico appear to reflect local innovation. 

Scholars such as  Dorothy Hosler suggest that ancient Mesoamericans were unique in their attention to the peculiar aesthetic properties of metals, such as the brilliant sounds and colors evoked through the movement of metallic objects. The rather late emergence of metallurgy in ancient Mesoamerica likely contributed to its novelty and subsequent role as a marker of elite status. 

It has been suggested that Mesoamerican metal smiths produced particular alloys with the chief aim of exploiting the alloys’ emergent color properties, particularly the vivid gold tones produced through infusion of tin, and the silver shades that develop at high arsenic concentrations. Notably, certain artifacts from West Mexico contain tin or arsenic at concentrations as high as 23 weight percent, while concentrations of alloying elements at roughly 2 to 5 weight percent are typically adequate for augmented strength and mechanical utility.

Metal smiths in pre-Columbian West Mexico particularly exploited the brilliance inherent in metallic sound and sheen, suggesting that their creations tended to occupy a sacred and symbolic space. Metallic colors, gold and silver, might have been connected with solar and lunar deities while bell sounds have been associated with fertility rituals and protection in warfare.

Archaeological sites yielding metal artifacts

Central Mexico
(AD 900–1450)
Utilitarian and ceremonial objects; Objects of personal adornment'
Atotonilco, Hidalgo
Calixtlahuaca, Mexico
Tenayuca, Mexico
Tenochitlan, Distrito Federal (D.F.)
Teotihuacan, Mexico
Texcoco, Mexico

West Mexico
(AD 800/900–1450)
Utilitarian and ceremonial objects; objects of personal adornment
Amapa, Nayarit
Apatzingán, Michoacán
Atoyac, Jalisco
Cojumatlán, Michoacán
Coyuca de Catalán, Guerrero
Culiacán, Sinaloa
Jiquilpan, Michoacán
Peñitas, Nayarit
Río Balsas, Guerrero
Tancitaro, Michoacán
Telpalcátepec, Michoacán
Tepic, Nayarit
Texmelincan, Guerrero
Tuxcacuesco, Jalisco
Tzintzuntzan, Michoacán
Yestla, Guerrero
Zacpu, Michoacán
Zamora, Michoacán

Eastern Mexico
(AD 900–1500)
Objects of personal adornment and ceremonial objects
Cerro Montoso, Veracruz
Chachalacas, Veracruz
El Tajin, Veracruz
Isla de Sacrificios, Veracruz
Pánuco, Veracruz
Tampico, Veracruz

Oaxaca area
(AD 900–1500)
Utilitarian and ceremonial objects; objects of personal adornment
Coatlán, Oaxaca
Coixtlahuaca, Oaxaca
Ejutla, Oaxaca
Guiengola, Oaxaca
Huajuapan, Oaxaca
Huitzo, Oaxaca
Juquila, Oaxaca
Mitla, Oaxaca
Monte Albán Oaxaca
Sola de Vega, Oaxaca
Tehuantepec, Oaxaca
Teotitlán del Camino, Oaxaca
Teotitlán del Valle, Oaxaca
Tlacolula, Oaxaca
Tlaxiaco, Oaxaca
Tututepec, Oaxaca
Xaaga, Oaxaca
Yanhuitlán, Oaxaca
Zachila, Oaxaca

Southern Maya Area
(AD 450(?)–1500)
Utilitarian and ceremonial objects; objects of personal adornment
Chipal, Guatemala
Chutixtiox, Guatemala
Copán, Honduras
Kaminaljuyú, Guatemala
Motagua River valley, Guatemala
Los Naranjos, Honduras
Nebaj, Guatemala
Quemistlá "Bell Caves", Honduras
Quiriguá, Guatemala
San Augustín Acasaguastlán, Guatemala
Tajumulco, Guatemala
Tazumal, El Salvador
Zacualpa, Guatemala
Zaculeu, Guatemala

Central Maya Area
(AD 900–1500)
Utilitarian and ceremonial objects; objects of personal adornment
Chiapa de Corzo, Chiapas
El Paredón, Chiapas
Polol, Guatemala
Santa Rita Corozal, Belize
Nojpetén, Guatemala
Tikal, Guatemala
Yaxhá, Guatemala
Palenque, Chiapas
Wild Cane Cay, Belize
Lamanai, Belize

Northern Maya Area
(1000–1450)
Utilitarian and ceremonial objects; objects of personal adornment
Chichén Itzá, Yucatán
Dzantún C’hen, Yucatán
Mayapán, Yucatán

Northern Mexico
(1000–1450)
Utilitarian objects; objects of personal adornment
Casas Grandes, Chihuahua
Chalchihuites, Zacatecas
Hervideros, Durango
La Quemada, Zacatecas
Navocoyán, Durango
Chihuahua, Chihuahua
Schroeder site, Durango
Venis Meicis, San Luis Potosí
Zape, Durango
Babicora, Chihuahua
Rancho San Miguiel, Chihuahua
Santa Maria R., Chihuahua

See also
Tumbaga
Traditional copper work in Mexico
Axe-monies

Notes

References
Hosler, Dorothy (1988). "Ancient West Mexican Metallurgy: South and Central American Origins and West Mexican Transformations". American Anthropologist 90: 832–855.
Hosler, Dorothy (1995). "Sound, color and meaning in the metallurgy of Ancient West Mexico". World Archaeology 27: 100–115.
Pendergast, David M. (1962). "Metal Artifacts in Prehispanic Mesoamerica". American Antiquity 27: 520–545.
Simmons, Scott E., David M. Pendergast and Elizabeth Graham (2009). "Maya Metals: The Context and Significance of Copper Artifacts in Postclassic and Early Historic Lamanai, Belize".  Journal of Field Archaeology 34(1):57–75.

External links
"The Maya Archaeometallurgy Project" at Lamanai, Belize
"The Mechanics of the Art World", Vistas: Visual Culture in Spanish America, 1520–1820. 

Science and technology in Mesoamerica
History of metallurgy